The 1990 Paris–Nice was the 48th edition of the Paris–Nice cycle race and was held from 4 March to 11 March 1990. The race started in Paris and finished at the Col d'Èze. The race was won by Miguel Induráin of the Banesto team.

Route

General classification

References

1990
1990 in road cycling
1990 in French sport
March 1990 sports events in Europe